Joseph or Joe Watson may refer to:

Joseph Watson (mayor) (1784–1841), American local political figure who served as mayor of Philadelphia, 1824–1828
Joseph Watson, 1st Baron Manton (1873–1922), English industrialist; chairman of soap firm Joseph Watson and Sons Ltd.
Joseph Watson (academic), Irish scholar; professor of Modern Irish at University College, Dublin
Joe Watson (American football) (1925–2006), American football player
Joe Watson (soccer) (1952–2000), Scottish-born Australian international footballer
Joe Watson (English footballer) (1906/1907 – after 1928), English footballer for Darlington
Joe Watson (folklorist) (1881–after 1975), Australian folk singer, songwriter and traveling musician
Joseph Watson (footballer), Australian rules footballer
Joe Watson (ice hockey) (born 1943), Canadian hockey player
Joseph Watson (teacher) (1765–1829), English teacher of the deaf, and writer on teaching the deaf

See also
Joseph Watson Sidebotham (1857–1925), British politician and colliery owner
Watson (surname)